Beth Macy (born c. 1964) is an American journalist and non-fiction writer. She is the author of four published books, including national bestsellers Factory Man (2014) and Dope Sick (2018).

Early life
The daughter of a factory worker, Sarah Macy Slack, and a housepainter father, Macy grew up in Urbana, Ohio. She was the first in her family to attend college, receiving a bachelor's degree in journalism from Bowling Green State University in 1986. She earned a master's degree in creative writing from Hollins University in 1993.

Career
Macy was a reporter for The Roanoke Times from 1989 to 2014. She writes essays and op-eds for The New York Times as well as magazines, radio and online journals. In 2010, she was awarded the Nieman Fellowship for Journalism by Harvard University.

Her 2018 book, Dopesick, was shortlisted for the 2019 Andrew Carnegie Medal for Excellence in Nonfiction.

Television adaptation
In June 2020, Hulu gave a limited series order for a new original production consisting of eight episodes based on Macy's book, Dopesick: Dealers, Doctors and the Drug Company that Addicted America. The series was developed by Danny Strong with Michael Keaton starring.

Awards
In 2022, Macy and Danny Strong won the USC Scripter Award for an episodic series, for the Dopesick episode, "The people vs Purdue Pharma". During her acceptance speech, Macy talked about America's struggle with opioid addiction.

Works
 Factory Man: How One Furniture Maker Battled Offshoring, Stayed Local—and Helped Save an American Town  (2014, Little Brown & Co.)
 Truevine: Two Brothers, a Kidnapping, and a Mother's Quest: A True Story of the Jim Crow South  (2016, Little, Brown & Co.)
 Dopesick: Dealers, Doctors, and the Drug Company That Addicted America (2018, Little, Brown & Co.)
 Finding Tess: A Mother’s Search for Answers in a Dopesick America (2019, Audible Original Audiobook, ASIN B07T2NSXHY)

References

External links 

Year of birth missing (living people)
Living people
20th-century American journalists
20th-century American women writers
21st-century American non-fiction writers
21st-century American women writers
American women essayists
American women journalists
Bowling Green State University alumni
Hollins University alumni
Journalists from Ohio
Journalists from Virginia
Nieman Fellows
People from Urbana, Ohio
Writers from Roanoke, Virginia